Digenis Lakkoma F.C. is a Greek football club, based in Lakkoma, Chalkidiki.

The club was founded in 1957. They will play in Football League 2 for the season 2013-14

External links
 http://digenhs-fc.blogspot.gr/

Football clubs in Central Macedonia